Caroline Pemberton is an Australian beauty pageant contestant, who was crowned Miss Australia in 2007.

Career

Pemberton was won the 2007 Miss Australia at Star City, Sydney on 4 April 2007. She went on to contest the Miss World title on 1 December 2007 in Sanya, China.

She was subsequently appointed as a Goodwill Ambassador for UNICEF, ambassador for the Sir David Martin Foundation, the Novus Foundation and joined the board of the Kokoda Trust.

Pemberton has also worked as a television presenter, and has produced content for companies including Red Bull, Outside TV, and the travel program Getaway.

Pemberton's hobbies include paragliding, surfing, boxing, canyoning, mountain biking, diving, skiing and mountaineering. She co-founded the Australian Women's Adventure Alliance, and campaigns under her MissAdventure brand to promote action sports and outdoor activities to girls and young women.

Personal life
She is the sister of Rex Pemberton, the youngest Australian to climb Mount Everest and the Seven Summits.

References

External links 
 
 Photograph by Mike Stone Sydney Australia 

Australian beauty pageant winners
Miss World 2007 delegates
Models from Sydney
Year of birth missing (living people)
Living people
People educated at Pymble Ladies' College